The Fender Telecaster Deluxe is a solid-body electric guitar originally produced from 1972 to 1981, and re-issued by Fender multiple times starting in 2004.

History
The popularity of heavy rock in the late 1960s led Fender to re-think its strategy of exclusively using single-coil pickups, as they were not perceived as being suitable for the thick sound and extended sustain favored by heavy rock guitarists using double-coil humbucking pickups. Consequently, Fender hired former Gibson employee Seth Lover, the inventor of the humbucker himself, to design a humbucking pickup for use in a number of Fender guitars. The result was a pickup known as the Wide Range humbucker, and it was used in a variety of different Fender models including the Deluxe, Custom, and Thinline Telecasters as well as a semi-hollowbody design called the Starcaster. The Deluxe, originally conceived as the top-of-the-line model in the Telecaster series, was the last of these to be released, in 1973.

The "humbucker" Telecasters failed to draw potential customers away from competition like Gibson's Les Paul model, and the Telecaster Deluxe was discontinued in 1981. However, in 2004, Fender decided to re-issue the Deluxe, probably in response to the belated popularity of the original 1970s version.

Features
The Deluxe is unique amongst Telecasters in that the neck has an enlarged headstock – a very similar 21-fret neck was used by Fender Stratocaster models manufactured in the late 1960s and throughout the 1970s. The main difference between the Telecaster Deluxe and Stratocaster necks from this period is that the Telecaster Deluxe neck used medium jumbo frets while the Stratocaster necks featured narrower fretwire. The Telecaster's neck also features the "Micro-Tilt" angle adjustment device located in the heel of the neck, similar to other Fender models of the period.

The body shape was similar to other Telecaster models of the era, with one minor difference – a "belly cut" contour similar to that featured on all Stratocasters was added to the back of the guitar. The Deluxe also had the same "glitch" in its shape as the other Telecasters – a slightly less-pronounced curve where the upper bout meets the neck joint, compared to earlier (and later) Telecasters. This was attributed to more modern routing machines installed in the production line at the time. The 2004 re-issue differs from the original in that it does not have the 1970s "notchless" body style.

The Deluxe features 2 Seth Lover-designed Wide Range humbuckers with "CuNiFe" (Copper/Nickel/Ferrite) rod magnets in the place of pole-pieces. This design yielded a brighter and clearer sound more similar to that of single coil pickups. They were wound with approximately 6,800 turns of copper wire, yielding a DC resistance of approximately 10.6 kΩ (compared to a standard Gibson P.A.F. humbucker typical DC resistance of 9 kΩ).

Most Deluxes produced have a "hard-tail" fixed bridge with Stratocaster-style string saddles, although for the first couple of years of production a vibrato bridge could be ordered with the guitar – this was the same bridge used on most Stratocasters. As this was not a standard option, models with the vibrato bridge are quite rare. Fender reintroduced the Tele Deluxe with bent steel FENDER FENDER marked saddles, while the originals from the 70's until 1981 were made of cast Mazac. (a zinc alloy)

The volume/tone knobs used on the early Deluxes were very similar to those used on Fender's "Blackface"/"Silverface" range of amplifiers with a chromed "skirt" tip on the top, however in the late 1970s these were replaced with black knobs identical to those used on the Stratocaster.

See also
List of Telecaster players

References

External links
 '72 Telecaster Deluxe re-issue at Fender.com

Fender Telecasters